The Germany men's national under-21 field hockey team represents Germanyin men's international under-21 field hockey competitions and is controlled by the German Hockey Federation, the governing body for field hockey in Germany.

The team competes in the EuroHockey Junior Championships which they have won six times. They have qualified for all Junior World Cups which they have won a record six times.

Tournament record

Junior World Cup
1979 – 
1982 – 
1985 – 
1989 – 
1993 – 
1997 – 
2001 – 
2005 – 6th place
2009 – 
2013 – 
2016 – 
2021 – 
 2023 – Qualified

EuroHockey Junior Championship
1976 – 
1977 – 
1978 – 
1981 – 
1984 – 
1988 – 
1992 – 
1996 – 
1998 – 
2000 – 
2002 – 
2004 – 
2006 – 
2008 – 
2010 – 
2012 – 
2014 – 
2017 – 
2019 – 
 2022 – 

Source:

Sultan of Johor Cup
2012 –

Players

Current squad
The following 18 players were named on 14 July 2022 for the 2022 Men's EuroHockey Junior Championship in Ghent, Belgium from 24 to 30 July 2022.

Caps updated as of 30 July 2022, after the match against the Netherlands.

Recent call-ups
The following players have also been called up to the squad within the last twelve months.

See also
 Germany men's national field hockey team
 Germany women's national under-21 field hockey team

References

Under-21
Men's national under-21 field hockey teams
Field hockey